The 2012 Guangzhou Evergrande season is the 59th year in Guangzhou Evergrande's existence and is its 45th season in the Chinese football league, also its 23rd season in the top flight. The club played in the AFC Champions League for the first time in club's history after winning the league title in the 2011 season.

Review
26 December 2011, Guangzhou confirmed that they had signed Zhao Xuri, Rong Hao, Li Jianbin and Peng Xinli for a total report fee of ¥30 million.
10 January 2012, Chinese midfielder Qin Sheng moved from Liaoning Whowin to Guangzhou with an undisclosed fee.
25 February 2012, Guangzhou beat Tianjin Teda 2–1 in the 2012 Chinese FA Super Cup, winning this trophy for the first time in the club's history. Cléo scored both goals of the match.
7 March 2012, Guangzhou beat K-League champions Jeonbuk Hyundai Motors 5–1 away in the club's first AFC Champions League match.
2 May 2012, Guangzhou Evergrande announced that they had signed Lucas Barrios from German Bundesliga side Borussia Dortmund on a four-year deal for a domestic record fee of €8.5 million.
4 May 2012, Darío Conca received a ban of at least 9 matches (including reserve league match) and was fined ¥1 million by the club for his remarks about the team manager Lee Jang-Soo's decision on Weibo.
15 May 2012, Guangzhou beat Buriram United 2–1 and advanced to the knockout phase of AFC Champions League.
17 May 2012, former Italian World Cup-winning football manager Marcello Lippi was appointed as the new manager of club, signing a two-and-a-half-year deal.
30 May 2012, Guangzhou beat J-League side FC Tokyo 1–0 in the Round of 16 of AFC Champions League, and became the first Chinese club to reach the quarterfinals of the AFC Champions League since 2006.
20 June 2012, CFA committee voted to pass  a rule change allowing CSL clubs, who were still  competing in the AFC Champions League, to add two more foreign players. Guangzhou Evergrande would be the only club able to take advantage out of the new rule change in the 2012 league season.
2 July 2012, Guangzhou Evergrande announced that they had signed South Korea national team defender Kim Young-Gwon on a four-year deal with a fee of US$2.5 million.
3 July 2012, Muriqui signed a new contract with Guangzhou Evergrande, keeping him at the club until 30 June 2016.
7 July 2012, Huang Bowen transferred to Guangzhou from K-League side Jeonbuk Hyundai Motors with a reported fee of US$2 million.
15 July 2012, Guangzhou Evergrande lost to Guangzhou R&F 0–1 at Tianhe Stadium, which ended club's record 34-league-home-match unbeaten run, as well as record 36-league-home-match scoring run.
2 October 2012, Guangzhou Evergrande was knocked out of the AFC Champions League in the quarter-finals by Al Ittihad 5–4 on aggregate.
27 October 2012, Guangzhou Evergrande won the league title for the second time in two years after beating Liaoning Whowin 1–0, with Gao Lin scoring the winning goal at the 90' minute to seal the title.
18 November 2012, Guangzhou Evergrande won their first Chinese FA Cup title, defeating Guizhou Renhe by a score of 4–2, on aggregate 5–3.

Players

First team squad

Reserve squad

Out on loan

Technical staff

Transfers

Winter

In:

Out:

Summer

In:

Out:

Pre-season and friendlies

Training matches

Marbella Cup 2012

2012 CSL All-Stars Game

Competitions

Overview

Chinese Super League

League table

Results summary

Results by round

Matches

Chinese FA Cup

Chinese FA Super Cup

AFC Champions League

Group stage

Knockout stage

Round of 16

Quarter-finals

Squad statistics

Notes and references

Guangzhou F.C.
Guangzhou F.C. seasons